Paul Doucet (born 1970) is a Canadian actor known for his portrayal of Jean Duceppe in Jean Duceppe.

Early life 
Doucet was born in Montreal, Quebec in 1970. He studied drama at the Université du Québec à Montréal.

Career 
His most recent work includes a leading role in The 3 L'il Pigs (Les 3 p'tits cochons) and its sequel The 3 L'il Pigs 2. Other roles include Camil DesRoches in The Rocket (Maurice Richard), Bittersweet Memories (Ma vie en cinémascope), Shattered City: The Halifax Explosion, All Souls, Mr. Meyer in À vos marques... party! 2, Benoît in Filière 13, Jackie Bouvier Kennedy Onassis mini-series as Ed Schlossberg, the prime minister in My Internship in Canada (Guibord s'en va-t-en guerre) and Canada: A People's History as Jean de Brébeuf.

Personal life 
Doucet's daughter is child actress Camille Felton.

Filmography

Film

Television

References

External links 
 

1970 births
Living people
Canadian male film actors
Canadian male television actors
Male actors from Montreal